Marco Natanael Torsiglieri (born 12 January 1988) is an Argentine footballer who plays as a central defender or a left-back.

Club career
Born in Castelar, Buenos Aires Province, Torsiglieri made his Primera División debut for Club Atlético Vélez Sarsfield on 18 November 2006, being loaned to Primera B Nacional club Talleres de Córdoba for the 2007–08 season. Returning to El Fortín he would be part of the Clausura 2009-winning squad, although he did not play in any of the games.

Torsiglieri left Vélez in June 2010 to play for Sporting Clube de Portugal, signing for €3.4 million. In July 2010, 50% of the player's rights regarding a future transfer were sold to investment group Quality Football Ireland Limited, for €1.7 million.

Torsiglieri made his official debut for Sporting on 16 September 2010, playing the full 90 minutes in a 2–1 group stage away win against Lille OSC in the UEFA Europa League. His first Primeira Liga appearance came on 24 October in a 1–0 home success over Rio Ave FC, and he finished his only season with the Lions with 23 matches all competitions comprised, with the team ranking third 36 points behind eventual champions FC Porto.

In July 2011, Torsiglieri joined FC Metalist Kharkiv on loan, and in December he signed a permanent five-year deal with the Ukrainians. On 3 August 2013, in the same predicament, he moved teams and countries again, signing a one-year deal with La Liga side UD Almería.

After spells playing for Boca Juniors, Monarcas Morelia, Rosario Central and Racing Club de Avellaneda, Torsiglieri returned to Vélez – his first professional team – for the second half of the 2017–18 season.

Honours
Vélez
Argentine Primera División: 2009 Clausura

References

External links
 Argentine League statistics  
 Official Vélez profile 
 

1988 births
Living people
Sportspeople from Buenos Aires Province
Argentine people of Italian descent
Argentine footballers
Association football defenders
Argentine Primera División players
Primera Nacional players
Primeira Liga players
La Liga players
Liga MX players
Ukrainian Premier League players
Bolivian Primera División players
Club Atlético Vélez Sarsfield footballers
Talleres de Córdoba footballers
Boca Juniors footballers
Rosario Central footballers
Racing Club de Avellaneda footballers
Club Atlético Lanús footballers
Sporting CP footballers
FC Metalist Kharkiv players
UD Almería players
Atlético Morelia players
Club de Gimnasia y Esgrima La Plata footballers
C.D. Jorge Wilstermann players
Argentine expatriate footballers
Expatriate footballers in Portugal
Expatriate footballers in Ukraine
Expatriate footballers in Spain
Expatriate footballers in Mexico
Expatriate footballers in Bolivia
Argentine expatriate sportspeople in Portugal
Argentine expatriate sportspeople in Ukraine
Argentine expatriate sportspeople in Spain
Argentine expatriate sportspeople in Mexico
Argentine expatriate sportspeople in Bolivia